The Puntio barb (Puntius puntio) is a species of ray-finned fish in the genus Puntius. It is found in India, Bangladesh and Myanmar.

References 

Puntius
Taxa named by Francis Buchanan-Hamilton
Fish described in 1822